Lacs de Conzieu are a group of three small lakes at Conzieu in the Ain department of France.

External links
   

Conzieu